Hemidactylus lanzai is a species of house gecko from Ethiopia.

References

Hemidactylus
Reptiles described in 2020
Reptiles of Ethiopia
Endemic fauna of Ethiopia